In mathematics, more specifically in functional analysis, a positive linear functional on an ordered vector space  is a linear functional  on  so that for all positive elements  that is  it holds that

In other words, a positive linear functional is guaranteed to take nonnegative values for positive elements. The significance of positive linear functionals lies in results such as Riesz–Markov–Kakutani representation theorem.

When  is a complex vector space, it is assumed that for all   is real.

Sufficient conditions for continuity of all positive linear functionals 

There is a comparatively large class of ordered topological vector spaces on which every positive linear form is necessarily continuous. 
This includes all topological vector lattices that are sequentially complete. 

Theorem Let  be an Ordered topological vector space with positive cone  and let  denote the family of all bounded subsets of  
  has non-empty topological interior (in ). 
  is complete and metrizable and  
  is the inductive limit of a family  of ordered Fréchet spaces with respect to a family of positive linear maps where  for all  where  is the positive cone of

Continuous positive extensions 

The following theorem is due to H. Bauer and independently, to Namioka. 

Corollary: Let  be an ordered topological vector space with positive cone  let  be a vector subspace of  If  contains an interior point of  then every continuous positive linear form on  has an extension to a continuous positive linear form on 

Proof: It suffices to endow  with the finest locally convex topology making  into a neighborhood of

Examples 

Consider, as an example of  the C*-algebra of complex square matrices with the positive elements being the positive-definite matrices. The trace function defined on this C*-algebra is a positive functional, as the eigenvalues of any positive-definite matrix are positive, and so its trace is positive.

Moreover, any positive functional on this space has this form, as follows from the Riesz–Markov–Kakutani representation theorem.

Positive linear functionals (C*-algebras) 

Let  be a C*-algebra (more generally, an operator system in a C*-algebra ) with identity  Let  denote the set of positive elements in 

Theorem.

Cauchy–Schwarz inequality 

Applications to economics 

See also

References

Bibliography

 Kadison, Richard, Fundamentals of the Theory of Operator Algebras, Vol. I : Elementary Theory, American Mathematical Society. .
  
  
  

Functional analysis
Linear functionals